Vulnerable Native Breeds are a group of dog breeds originating in the United Kingdom and Ireland, and identified by The Kennel Club (KC) as having annual registration numbers of 300 puppies or fewer within the UK. The KC identified its need for such a list in June 2003, with research it conducted to identify the extent of the vulnerability and viability of each breed. It was a joint project, with the KC working with the British and Irish Native Breeds Trust, later to be known simply as the Native Dog Breeds Trust. The breeds on the list have been promoted at events such as Discover Dogs and Crufts, and by asking that owners of these breeds mate their dogs rather than having them spayed.

The majority of the list comes from the Terrier Group, a group mostly derived from breeds with backgrounds in the British Isles. The most marked drop in popularity is that of the Sealyham Terrier, which registered 1,084 breeds in 1938, but by 2004 was registering only sixty dogs a year. In October 2011, British magazine Country Life highlighted the breed on its front cover, with the heading "SOS: Save our Sealyhams," and launched a campaign to save the breed. The Otterhound, popular during the time of Henry VIII, has registration numbers of less than a thousand world wide.

The list was originally compiled in January 2006, and included 28 breeds.  Later in 2006, the Miniature Bull Terrier was added.  In 2007, after consultation with the breed clubs involved, the Bloodhound, Gordon Setter and King Charles Spaniel were re-classed as "Viable" rather than vulnerable. The English Setter is the newest addition to the list, having been added for the first time in 2012. However, during 2012 the number of English Setter puppies registered increased to 314, so the breed was moved to the Kennel Club's "At Watch" list, which is for breeds with registrations from 300-450. Breeds on the "At Watch" list included in 2013 the English Setter, the Old English Sheepdog, the Irish Terrier, the Irish Wolfhound, the Welsh Springer Spaniel, the Pembroke Welsh Corgi, and the Welsh Terrier.

Listed breeds 

Key

Table

Notes

A ^ The breeds are listed by their names official registration names with the Kennel Club.

References

External links
British Heritage Dog Breeds

Dog breeds originating in the United Kingdom

Dog breeds originating in Ireland